Columbia Airport  is located a mile southwest of Columbia, in Tuolumne County, California, United States. It is owned by the County of Tuolumne.

Facilities

In the year ending August 3, 2011 the airport had 46,020 aircraft operations, average 126 per day: 96% general aviation, 4% air taxi and less than 1% military. 106 aircraft are based at the airport: 91% single engine, 4% helicopter, 3% multi-engine, 1% jet, and 1% ultralight.

Cal Fire Firefighting Air Attack Base

The California Department of Forestry and Fire Protection (Cal Fire) operates an aerial firefighting air attack base at the airport with three fixed wing twin engine turboprop aircraft including one North American Rockwell OV-10 Bronco spotter airplane and two Grumman S-2 Tracker air tankers (S-2T version) which are based at the airfield. Cal Fire also bases a Bell UH-1H "Huey" firefighting helicopter at the airport.

Historical air service 

The airport had scheduled passenger airline service operated by Yosemite Airlines, a small commuter air carrier which was based at Columbia Airport, from the mid-1970s to the early 1980s.  According to the Official Airline Guide (OAG) as well as the airline's timetables, Yosemite Airlines flew nonstop and direct service between the airport and Sacramento International Airport (SMF), San Francisco International Airport (SFO) and Oakland International Airport (OAK) with small Beechcraft, Cessna and Piper prop aircraft. The airline's route maps from this same time period also show nonstop service from the airport to Lake Tahoe, Modesto and Stockton.

In 1999, Scenic Air, another commuter airline, was operating daily nonstop service between the airport and Oakland International Airport (OAK) with Grumman Gulfstream I propjet aircraft.

The airport was used as a filming location for several sequences in the 1992 film Radio Flyer.

References

External links 

Sierra Nevada (United States)
Airports in Tuolumne County, California